The women's half marathon event at the 2009 Summer Universiade was held on 11 July.

Results

References

Results (archived)

Half
2009 in women's athletics
2009